The men's vault competition at the 2018 Asian Games took place on 20 and 24 August 2018 at the Jakarta International Expo Hall D2.

Schedule
All times are Western Indonesia Time (UTC+07:00)

Results 
Legend
DNS — Did not start

Qualification

Final

References

External links
Results

Artistic Men's vault